Abdoleh (also Romanized as ‘Abdoleh; also known as Abdolī, ‘Abdollāh, and ‘Abdullah) is a village in Fakhrud Rural District, Qohestan District, Darmian County, South Khorasan Province, Iran. At the 2006 census, its population was 65, in 21 families.

References 

Populated places in Darmian County